Odunayo Andrew Akinwolere (born 30 November 1982), previously known as Andy Akinwolere, is a British television presenter.

Early life
Akinwolere was born in Ibadan, Nigeria in 1982, and moved to the United Kingdom with his family when he was eight years old, where he adopted the name "Andy". They settled in Birmingham, where he went to school. His parents are doctors and work in Kidderminster in Worcestershire.Ronaldo Fan but also support Messi

Education
Akinwolere attended St. Thomas Aquinas Catholic School in Kings Norton, a district of Birmingham, and then Sheffield Hallam University, from which he graduated in 2004, with a BA degree in Media Studies.

Career
Akinwolere's first job was as a runner for the BBC. He was asked to audition by one of the Blue Peter directors he met whilst eating out with colleagues; he had previously intended to go into documentary-making and radio. He began co-presenting Blue Peter on 28 June 2006. Whilst on the show he was nominated for two British Academy Children's Awards: the Presenter of the Year Children's BAFTA, and Blue Peter the following year for Best Factual Programme. In 2008 as lead presenter Akinwolere hosted Queen Elizabeth II to celebrate 50 years of Blue Peter. In June 2011, he set a new world record for the deepest location for an open water swim, when he swam more than five miles across the Palau Trench in the Pacific Ocean – the first person to have done so. This was the last major challenge he did on Blue Peter before leaving the show at the end of the season.

He took part in the TV program Ready Steady Cook, competing against fellow presenter Konnie Huq in December 2007. In the same year, he appeared on the Weakest Link where he was the fifth to be eliminated. On 25 April 2011, Akinwolere was a contestant on Total Wipeout'''s second Celebrity Special of series 4 but had to quit due to injury.

In 2012, he co-presented the third season of Fort Boyard: Ultimate Challenge alongside Laura Hamilton. He presented the show for two series. Both were nominated for a British Academy Children's Awards for Best Entertainment Programme in 2014.

In 2012 Akinwolere went to Jamaica to interview sprinter Usain Bolt, in a documentary for the BBC. The documentary looked to understand through various theories, why Jamaica as a nation had dominated the world of sprinting for so long. In January 2013 he appeared in a special series of The Great British Bake Off for Comic Relief which was won by Warwick Davis. In 2016 Akinwolere was a contestant on Celebrity Master Chef in which he competed with Rylan Clark Arlene Phillips, Kimberly Wyatt and Craig Gazey.
 
In 2014, Akinwolere became the presenter of the BBC's current affairs program Inside Out for the West Midlands for which he has won the Best Factual Royal Television Society Award for his documentary on extremism. While presenting Inside Out West Midlands, he resumed using the name Ayo, his birth name.

In 2018, he became a co-presenter on Channel 4's coverage of the European Rugby Champions Cup.

In September 2020, Akinwolere was hired by CBS Sports (US) to present the UEFA Europa League edition of the whip-around show The Golazo Show which airs in the US on CBS Sports Network and is streamed to US viewers via Paramount Plus on match Thursdays.  Panelists on the UEFA Europa League edition of The Golazo Show include Nicolás Cantor, Lianne San, derson and Julien Laurens.

Personal life
Akinwolere has four siblings – three brothers and one sister who live in the United States. His first language growing up was Yoruba, in addition to English; which he learned when the family moved to Birmingham. His parents both lived abroad for a while and he spent a small part of his childhood living in Nancy, France.  He is an amateur photographer and has had pictures published in National Geographic Kids Magazine and the 2010 Christmas edition of Vogue Bambini.  He is also a keen collector of rare vinyl and rare music.  He lives in Margate, Kent.

Filmography

Awards
In 2008 and 2010 Akinwolere was nominated for Presenter of the year at the BAFTA Children's Award. BAFTA Children's Awards 2008 nominees

2015 won a Royal Television Society award for his Inside Out'' documentary on Extremism

References

External links
 Akinwolere's blog on Blue Peter website

Alumni of Sheffield Hallam University
Black British television personalities
Blue Peter presenters
English people of Yoruba descent
Yoruba television personalities
Nigerian emigrants to the United Kingdom
Nigerian expatriates in France
Nigerian male swimmers
Yoruba sportspeople
1982 births
Living people
People from Birmingham, West Midlands
English male swimmers